Neo-Lutheranism was a 19th-century revival movement within Lutheranism which began with the Pietist-driven Erweckung, or Awakening, and developed in reaction against theological rationalism and pietism. This movement followed the Old Lutheran movement and focused on a reassertion of the identity of Lutherans as a distinct group within the broader community of Christians, with a renewed focus on the Lutheran Confessions as a key source of Lutheran doctrine. Associated with these changes was a renewed focus on traditional doctrine and liturgy, which paralleled the growth of Anglo-Catholicism in England. It was sometimes even called "German Puseyism". In the Roman Catholic Church in Germany, neo-Lutheranism was paralleled by Johann Adam Möhler. The chief literary organ of the neo-Lutheranism was Evangelische Kirchenzeitung, edited by Ernst Wilhelm Hengstenberg.

Repristination versus Erlangen school
Neo-Lutheranism developed as a reaction against the Prussian Union in a similar manner to the development of Tractarianism against the British government's decision to reduce the number of Irish bishoprics. The term has been defined different ways to distinguish it from the Old Lutherans movement, which was a schism in areas where a church union was enforced. Also, a distinction developed in neo-Lutheranism whereby one side held to repristination theology that tried to restore historical Lutheranism, while the other held to the theology of the Erlangen School. The repristination theology group was represented by Ernst Wilhelm Hengstenberg, Carl Paul Caspari, Gustav Adolf Theodor Felix Hönecke, Friedrich Adolf Philippi, and C. F. W. Walther. Repristination theology is more similar to later Confessional Lutheranism. In contrast, confessionalism to the Erlangen School was not to be static, but dynamic. The Erlangen School tried to combine Reformation theology with new learning. The Erlangen School included Franz Hermann Reinhold von Frank, Theodosius Harnack, Franz Delitzsch, Johann Christian Konrad von Hofmann, Karl Friedrich August Kahnis, Christoph Ernst Luthardt, and Gottfried Thomasius.

High Church Lutheranism

However, neo-Lutheranism is sometimes limited only to the theology and activity represented by Theodor Friedrich Dethlof Kliefoth, August Friedrich Christian Vilmar, Johann Konrad Wilhelm Löhe, August Friedrich Otto Münchmeyer, and Friedrich Julius Stahl who had particularly high ecclesiology. They were against the idea of the invisible church, strongly claiming that the church was an outward, visible institution of salvation. They therefore emphasised the ordained ministry instituted by Christ and the significance of the sacraments over the Word as Means of Grace. However, unlike the Erlangen School, this type of neo-Lutheranism did not have a lasting influence on Lutheran theology. Properly speaking, High Church Lutheranism began in Germany much later, with the creation of the Hochkirchliche Vereinigung Augsburgischen Bekenntnisses in 1918, inspired by 95 theses Stimuli et Clavi of 1917, exactly 100 years after Claus Harms' 95 theses.
 
Neo-Lutheranism is distinct from the term Neo-Protestantism, which is an exclusively liberal theology represented, for example, by Adolf von Harnack and his followers.

See also

 Evangelical Catholic
 Gottlieb Christoph Adolf von Harless
 Fredrik Gabriel Hedberg
 Gisle Johnson
 U. V. Koren
 Charles Porterfield Krauth
 Ludwig Adolf Petri
 Herman Amberg Preus
 Andreas Gottlob Rudelbach

References

Gustaf Aulén: Dogmhistoria, Stockholm 1933

Christian theological movements
19th-century Lutheranism
History of Lutheranism in Germany
Lutheran theology
Erlangen
19th century in Germany
Lutheran revivals